a passenger railway station in the city of Katori, Chiba Japan, operated by the East Japan Railway Company (JR East).

Lines
Ōto Station is served by the Narita Line, and is located 36.1 kilometers from the terminus of line at Sakura Station.

Layout
Ōto Station has a single island platform connected to the neighboring streets by a footbridge. There is no station building.

Platforms

History
Ōto Station was opened on April 1, 1926 as a station on the Japanese Government Railway (JGR) for both passenger and freight operations. After World War II, the JGR became the Japan National Railways (JNR). Scheduled freight operations were suspended from October 1, 1962. The station has been unattended since July 1, 1970. The station was absorbed into the JR East network upon the privatization of the Japan National Railways (JNR) on April 1, 1987. The station building was rebuilt from 2007–2011.

Passenger statistics
In fiscal 2006, the station was used by an average of 243 passengers daily.

Surrounding area
 
 Ōto Jinja

See also
 List of railway stations in Japan

References

External links

JR East station information 

Railway stations in Japan opened in 1926
Railway stations in Chiba Prefecture
Narita Line
Katori, Chiba